Takht Singh, GCSI  (6 June 1819 – 13 February 1873) was first the regent (1839–1841) and the final Maharaja of Ahmednagar (Himmatnagar) 1841–1843 as a result of an agreement with the British. Once he ceded Ahmednagar (Himmatnagar) to Idar, he was recognized as Maharaja of Jodhpur (1843–1873).

He was born in Ahmednagar (Himmatnagar), the second son of Karan Singh and grandson of Sagram Singh, the Maharaja of Ahmednagar (Himmatnagar) from 1798 to 1835.  He had little prospect of ascending the throne, yet after the death of his brother, Prithi Singh in 1839, he became the regent over the whole state and served as such until the birth of his brother's son, Balwant Singh, who was proclaimed ruler at his birth. Takht Singh then became the new ruler's regent and served as such until the death of his nephew on 23 September 1841, when he became the Maharaja of Ahmednagar (Himmatnagar).

However, two years into his reign in 1843, Man Singh, the Maharaja of Jodhpur died.  He was persuaded by his widows to take the succession as he was a member of the Rathore Dynasty through his grandfather, Sagram Singh, the Maharaja of Idar, who himself was the son of Anand Singh, the first Maharaja of Idar and a younger son of  Maharaja Ajit Singh, Maharaja of Jodhpur, however, he had to cede Ahmednagar (Himmatnagar) back to the state of Idar to be recognized in Jodhpur by the British.

So, on 29 October 1843, he ascended the gadi at the Sringar Chowki in Mehrangarh. Later in his life, he served loyal service to British at the time of  Indian Mutiny of 1857  and in 1862 he received a sanad of adoption. During his life he was a chronic womanizer.;He married 30 wives. He died in Jodhpur on 13 February 1873 and was cremated at Mandore. He was succeeded by his eldest son Jaswant Singh II in Jodhpur, while his third son, Pratap Singh would go on to become the Maharaja of Idar. His first-born daughter, Kumari Chand Kanwar Bai Lal, would be married to Maharaja Sawai Ram Singh II, the Maharaja of Jaipur.

References

 
 
 
 
 

1819 births
1873 deaths
Knights Grand Commander of the Order of the Star of India
Takht
Indian knights